Harishchandra Patil is an Indian politician and member of the Bharatiya Janata Party. Patil was a member of the Maharashtra Legislative Assembly from the Kalyan East constituency in Thane district. He was mayor of Kalyan-Dombivli Municipal Corporation and was also Leader of Opposition.

References 

People from Kalyan, India
Bharatiya Janata Party politicians from Maharashtra
Members of the Maharashtra Legislative Assembly
1954 births
2016 deaths
21st-century Indian politicians
Maharashtra politicians
Mayors of places in Maharashtra
People from Kalyan-Dombivli